Starburst (originally known as Opal Fruits) is the brand name of a box-shaped, fruit-flavoured soft taffy candy manufactured by The Wrigley Company, which today is a subsidiary of Mars, Incorporated. Starburst has many different varieties, such as Tropical, Sour, FaveREDs, Watermelon, Very Berry, Superfruit, Summer Blast and Original. 

Introduced in the United Kingdom in 1960, the regular flavours are blackcurrant, lemon and lime, orange and strawberry.

History
The brand was introduced by Mars in the UK in 1960, named Opal Fruits by Peter Phillips (known as Peter Pfeffer at the time), the winner of a competition that won him £5. Produced at their factory in Slough, Berkshire, the four original flavours were strawberry, lemon, orange and lime. Opal Fruits were introduced in the United States in 1967 as M&M's Fruit Chewies and later as Starburst. While the etymology of the name Starburst isn't certain, it was probably an attempt to express the burst of flavour at each bite, and draw attention while space interest was at its peak during the Space Race. Originally, Starburst came in the same flavours as Opal Fruits, though the lime flavour was replaced by cherry in the US in the early 1980s. Subsequently, its first variant, "Sunshine Flavors", was released, and was later renamed "Tropical Opal Fruits". In Europe, the lemon and lime flavours were combined to become a singular "Lemon and lime" flavour to make room for a blackcurrant flavour.

The brand name Opal Fruits was phased out in the UK, followed by Ireland in 1998 in order to standardise the product in a globalised marketplace. In 2008, however, the supermarket chain Asda revived the original Opal Fruits in the UK for a period of 12 weeks starting 10 May 2008.  On 6 October 2008, Mars acquired Wrigley and it transferred Mars' non-chocolate candy brands, including Starburst, to the Wrigley subsidiary. The original flavours are now branded "Original Fruits", and Starburst now comes in several assortments: FaveREDs, Limited Edition Retro Fruits, Tropical, Baja California, Sour, Strawberry Mix, Berries and Creme, Very Berry and Fruity Slushies. Among the additional flavours are Strawberry Lemonade, Strawberry-Banana, Blue Raspberry, Blue Raspberry Rush, Cherry Splash, Citrus Slush, Kiwi, Banana, Plum, Passion Fruit, Mango, Blueberry, Blackberry, Raspberry, Melon, Watermelon, Tropical Punch, Green Apple, Orange Cream, Mixed Berries and Cream, Peaches and Cream and Strawberry and Cream. Europe and the United States also has the "Sour" assortment, which includes Apple, Cherry, Pineapple and Raspberry, as well as Strawberry Mix.

Starburst in the UK is vegetarian, its packaging and website clearly stating "Suitable for Vegetarians", and also does not contain any artificial colours or flavours. In the US, Starburst contains non-vegan gelatin in its ingredients.

Lime Starburst made a comeback in 2007 as a limited-edition "retro" flavour in packages of the "Baja" version, while the range in the UK was further extended with a version named Starburst Choozers. These lozenge shaped chews have a liquid fruit juice centre, and come packaged with the tag line "The chews that ooze." Each packet contains three flavours; Orange & Mango, Raspberry & Orange and Pineapple & Orange.

As of August 2016, the advertising slogan for Starburst is "Unexplainably Juicy".

During March 2020, the Opal Fruits name was revived again for a limited period in the UK with a 152g bag available in Poundland and Dealz stores initially, which included the four original flavours (lemon, strawberry, orange, lime).

Starburst products were entirely discontinued in New Zealand in April 2021, and in Australia in June 2022. Starburst-branded products had been sold in Australia since 1996.

Marketing
In the 1970s, Opal Fruits were well known in the UK for their advertising tag line "Opal Fruits—made to make your mouth water!" (slogan coined by Murray Walker). The full advertising jingle was "Opal Fruits—made to make your mouth water/Fresh with the tang of citrus/four refreshing fruit flavours/orange, lemon, strawberry, lime/Opal Fruits—made to make your mouth water!"

Starburst has been marketed in several ways, including a marketing tie-in for the movie Pirates of the Caribbean: Dead Man's Chest where they replaced Kiwi Banana and Tropical Punch with Royal Berry Punch.

In 2002, Starburst created a song for the Australian market called "Get Your Juices Going". It was released as a CD single and attributed to a fictional pop group also called Starburst.

In 2007, a commercial for Starburst's Berries and Creme flavour went viral. The commercial, referred to as "Berries and Creme" or as "The Little Lad Dance", stars a man dressed in Victorian/Georgian clothing expressing his excitement for the candy's flavour by performing an impromptu song and dance routine. The commercial received praise for its style from Advertising Age. In an interview with Adweek the actor of the character (Jack Ferver) commented that the commercial took over 12 hours to film and that they had to wear the full costume in  weather.

In the second half of 2021, the Berries and Creme commercial went viral for a second time, with a number of videos on TikTok using the audio and the "Little Lad Dance".

Other varieties
Starburst also exists or has existed in the form of vines "fruit twists", ropes, candy corn, popsicles, gum, candy canes, jelly beans, fruit roll ups, gelatin, energy drinks (in partnership with C4 Energy), lip gloss (in a partnership with Lip Smackers) and yogurt (by Yoplait in 2019 as a flavour). The company also produces 'heart-shaped' jelly beans for Valentine's Day. In 2021, Starburst released their first vegan gummy candy in the US.

A range of non-taffy Starburst products for the Australian and New Zealand markets were produced from 1997 to 2020; products included 'Snakes' gummies and 'Sucks' lollipops.

References

External links
 

Products introduced in 1960
Mars confectionery brands
Wrigley Company brands
British confectionery
Candy
American confectionery
Irish confectionery
Brand name confectionery